Praveen Singh Aron is a politician belonging to the Indian National Congress party. He was a member of the Lok Sabha, the lower house of the Parliament of India from the Bareilly Lok Sabha constituency between 2009 and 2014. He had also served as MLA twice from Bareilly between 1989 and 1991 and 1993 and 1995. He has also served as minister of state in the government of Uttar  Pradesh.

Positions held

1. 1989-91	Member, Uttar Pradesh Legislative Assembly from Bareilly Cantonment Janata Dal

2. 1993-95	Member, Uttar Pradesh Legislative Assembly (second term) from Bareilly Cantonment Samajwadi Party

3. Minister of State, Science and Information Technology, Government of Uttar Pradesh

4.  from 1995	Minister of State, Health and Family Welfare, Government of Uttar Pradesh

5. 2009	Elected to 15th Lok Sabha from Bareilly

References

1959 births
Living people
Indian National Congress politicians
People from Bareilly district
India MPs 2009–2014
Lok Sabha members from Uttar Pradesh
United Progressive Alliance candidates in the 2014 Indian general election
Samajwadi Party politicians from Uttar Pradesh
Janata Dal politicians
Indian National Congress politicians from Uttar Pradesh